Laban sa Lahat
() is a 1958 action film 
based from a novel created by Francisco Coching which was serialized in Liwayway Magazine. The film was directed by Cirio H. Santiago, written by Cesar Amigo and stars Fernando Poe Jr., Leonor Vergara, and Lauro Delgado. In this film the story centers around a young man named Lupo, who was wrongly and falsely accused of a crime.

Plot 
Since childhood, Lupo is branded as a trouble-maker, Everything he does is misconstrued by people in spite of his good intentions. He grows up with the whole town biased against him. Even Clarissa, his sweetheart, has lost faith and it is only her love for him which makes her try to be patient with him. 

Lupo gets into big trouble when Don Antero and his son, Marco, with the aid of imported thugs break into the church and strip it of its treasures. The heinous crime is blamed on Lupo, and Dario, Lupe's own brother who is a dedicated policeman, is assigned to head the posse to track him down. 

Clarissa, however, is convinced of Lupe's innocence because on the night of the robbery, she had spent the night with him. Unfortunately, she cannot speak out in Lupo's defense without exposing herself to moral condemnation. 

Alone, hunted by his own brother, Lupo seeks to redeem himself by uncovering the real culprits. He is able to kill Don Antero in a struggle but this only serves to aggravate things. He captures Max, one of Marco's henchmen but is cornered by the posse atop the church's bell tower. 

Facing the guns at the posse led by his own brother and with Max tied to a lamp post which he can cover from the belfry, Lupe makes a final attempt to clear himself and this he does in a tense, thundering finale.

Cast 
 Fernando Poe Jr. as Lupo
 Leonor Vergara as Clarissa
 Lauro Delgado as Dario
 Oscar Roncal as Marco
 Elvira Reyes
 Belen Velasco
 Bruno Punzalan as Max
 Jose Garcia as Don Antero
 Francisco Cruz
 Dencio Padilla
 Bino Garcia
 Paquito Diaz
 Jess Lapid Sr.  as Jesus Lapid

Release
Laban sa Lahat was released in the Philippines on October 7, 1958.

Awards and nominations

References 

Films directed by Cirio H. Santiago